Dan is a given name and surname in various cultures.

Given name

Origins as a given name 

Dan is an old Scandinavian given name with several disputed origins. The most likely theory is that it originated from the Old Norse ethnonym  for Danes. This in turn originated from the Proto-Germanic masculine word *. There are several historical variants including * "half-Dane", as well as * "Danish" (where the  suffix is ancestral to modern English ).

The name Dan is also a Hebrew given name, after Dan, the fifth son of Jacob with Bilhah and founder of the Israelite Tribe of Dan. It is also (along with the variant Danny) a given name or a nickname for people named Daniel.

Surname

Origins 
As an English surname, Dan is a variant spelling of Dann. Dann, another variant spelling of which is Dane, is a toponymic surname which derives from the Old-Norse  and earlier as the Proto-Germanic word . It also originates from the Middle English  and Old English , "valley".

The Hebrew surname Dan is a biblical name which refers to the tribe of Dan. As a given name it first appears in Genesis 30.

The Hungarian surname Dán is an abbreviation of Dániel.

There are multiple Chinese surnames which are romanised as Dan, including:
, meaning "red"

There are multiple Japanese surnames which are romanised as Dan, including:
, meaning Euonymus hamiltonianus, and also used in the names of various species of other trees, including sandalwoods
, meaning "group"

There are three separate Korean surnames spelled in the Revised Romanization of Korean as Dan, each written with a different hanja. Bearers of each surname identify with a number of distinct bon-gwan, which are hometowns of clan lineages.
This character is also used to write the Chinese surname now pronounced Duàn in Mandarin. Major clans with this surname include:
The , who claim descent from Dan Gan-mok, an official under Chungnyeol of Goryeo. 
This character is also used to write the Chinese surname now pronounced Shàn in Mandarin.

Statistics 
In South Korea, the 2000 census found 1,429 people belonging to 437 households with the surname Dan meaning "stairs". There were also 122 people belonging to 40 households with the surname Dan meaning "single", and 34 people belonging to nine households with the surname Dan meaning "end".

According to statistics cited by Patrick Hanks, there were 284 people on the island of Great Britain and 13 people on the island of Ireland with the surname Dan as of 2011. There had been 177 bearers of the surname in Great Britain in 1881, primarily in Devonshire and Cornwall.

The 2010 United States Census found 2,599 people with the surname Dan, making it the 12,012th-most-common name in the country. This represented an increase from 2,315 (12,317th-most-common) in the 2000 Census. In both censuses, about half of the bearers of the surname identified as White, and one-quarter as Asian. Dan was the 1,670th-most-common surname among respondents to the 2000 Census who identified as Asian.

People

Chinese surnames Dān and Dàn 
 Dan Duyu (1897–1972), Chinese film director
 Judy Dan (born 1930), Chinese-born American actress
 Yang Dan (neuroscientist), Chinese-born American neuroscientist

Japanese surnames Dan 
 Fumi Dan (born 1954), Japanese actress
 Jirō Dan, stage name of Hideo Murata (born 1949), Japanese actor
 Kazuo Dan (1912–1976), Japanese novelist and poet
 Mitsu Dan, stage name of Shizuka Saitō (born 1980), Japanese actress
 Rei Dan, stage name of Mayumi Yamazaki (born 1971), Japanese actress
 Tomoyuki Dan (1963–2013), Japanese actor and voice actor

Romanian 
 Alexandru Dan (born 1994), Romanian football midfielder
 Aurora Dan (born 1955), Romanian fencer
 Cristian Florin Dan (born 1979), Romanian football playmaker
 Călin Dan (born 1955), Romanian artist, theorist, and curator
 Dan Petrescu (b. 1967), Romanian football manager and former player
 Dan Petrescu (businessman) (1953–2021), Romanian businessman and billionaire
 Jo Jo Dan (born 1981), Romanian boxer
 Marin Dan (born 1948), Romanian handball player
 Matei-Agathon Dan (born 1949), Romanian economist and politician
 Nicușor Dan (born 1969), Romanian activist and mathematician
 Pavel Dan (1907–1937), Romanian short story writer
 Sergiu Dan (1903–1976), Romanian novelist

Other 
 Aubrey Dan (born 1963), Canadian businesswoman
 Bill Dan, Indonesian-born American sculptor and performance artist
 Fyodor Dan (1871–1947), Russian Marxist revolutionary
 Joseph Dan (born 1935), Hungarian-born Israeli scholar of Jewish mysticism
 Leslie Dan (born 1929), Hungarian-born Canadian businessman
 Liran Dan, Israeli government official and media executive
 Paul Dan (born 1985), Australian rugby union player
 Seaman Dan (Henry Gibson Dan, 1929–2020), Australia-Torres Straits Islander singer

See also 
 Daniel (disambiguation)
 Danny (disambiguation)

References 

English-language surnames
Hebrew-language surnames
Romanian-language surnames
Romanian masculine given names
Chinese-language surnames
Multiple Chinese surnames
Japanese-language surnames
Korean-language surnames
English masculine given names
English unisex given names